Shockley is a surname. Notable people with the surname include:

Dolores Cooper Shockley, American pharmacist
D.J. Shockley, American football player
William Shockley, winner of the Nobel Prize for physics

Fictional characters
Detective Ben Shockley, protagonist of the 1977 film The Gauntlet

See also
Shockley Semiconductor Laboratory
William Shockley (disambiguation)